Małgorzata Helena Sekuła-Szmajdzińska (born 19 April 1956) is a Polish lawyer and politician.

Biography 
Born in Warsaw, she moved to Wrocław at a young age. She studied at University of Wrocław, and as a lawyer she worked at the Ministry of Justice.

Electoral history 
She ran unsuccessfully to the Warsaw city council in 2006, but in 2010 she was elected to the council. In 2011 she was elected to the Sejm. In 2015, despite getting individual votes, she was not elected as the Democratic Left Alliance did not pass the electoral threshold as a list. In May 2019 she ran for MeP, but was not elected. She was elected to the Sejm again in October 2019.

Private life 
She is the widow of Jerzy Szmajdziński, who died in Smolensk air disaster. The couple has two children, Agnieszka and Andrzej.

References

1956 births
Living people
Democratic Left Alliance politicians
Members of the Polish Sejm 2011–2015
Members of the Polish Sejm 2019–2023
Women members of the Sejm of the Republic of Poland
21st-century Polish women politicians